Presidium Convent also known as simply (P!K!) is an organisation that unites all-male academic corporations in Latvia.

History 
Presidium Convent was established in autumn 1919, almost together with the University of Latvia. However it de facto started work only in autumn 1920, after the Latvian War of Independence ended.
Founders of Presidium Convent were the five oldest Latvian student corporations: Lettonia, Selonija, Lettgallia, Talavija, Fraternitas Lettica.

In the interwar period many new Latvian student corporations were admitted to Presidium Convent. In 1920s all Baltic-German corps (Curonia, Fraternitas Baltica, Concordia Rigensis, Fraternitas Rigensis, Rubonia, Gotonia) were also admitted. However, in 1932 all  left in protest at a decision that the Latvian language must be used in Presidium Convent meetings.

In 1940, after Soviet occupation of Latvia, Presidium Convent were closed, like other Latvian student organisations. After the  Second World War most of Latvian student corporations renewed their work in exile. In such conditions, it was impossible to renew Presidium Convent in its pre-war shape, so in 1949 a new global organization was formed which united all Latvian student corporations in exile, the  Union of Latvian Corporations (Latvian: Latvijas Korporāciju apvienība).

Presidium Convent was restored in Latvia in 1990. Today it unites 22 Latvian and 1 Russian student corporations.

Member organizations 
 Lettonia
 Fraternitas Arctica
 Selonija
 Lettgallia
 Talavija
 Fraternitas Lettica
 Latvia
 Ventonia
 Tervetia
 Beveronija
 Philyronia
 Fraternitas Metropolitana
 Fraternitas Vesthardiana
 Fraternitas Academica
 Fraternitas Lataviensis
 Patria
 Fraternitas Livonica
 Vendia
 Lacuania
 Fraternitas Imantica
 Gersicania
 Fraternitas Cursica
 Fraternitas Vanenica

External links 

 Website

Student organisations in Latvia